Nanhua University (NHU) is a university located in Dalin Township, Chiayi County, Taiwan. Founded in 1996 as the Nanhua College of Management, it was elevated to university status in 1999. The university was founded by the Buddhist monk Hsing Yun of Fo Guang Shan. In 2022, Times Higher Education's World University Rankings ranks NHU as 95th of the "Impact Rankings: Reducing inequalities" in the world. 

NU offers undergraduate and graduate programs in a variety of fields, including humanities, social sciences, management, and science and technology.

The university has partnerships with over 100 universities in more than 30 countries, and students can participate in exchange programs, study tours, and other international activities.

Administrative units

Teaching units
 College of Management
 Department of Business Administration (Bachelor, Master, and Doctoral Programs in Management Sciences)
 Department of Nonprofit Organization Management (Master Program)
 Department of Finance (Bachelor and Master Programs in Financial Management)
 Department of Cultural & Creative Enterprise Management (Bachelor Program, Master Program)
 Master Program in Leisure and Environment Management
 Department of Tourism Management (Bachelor Program and Master Program in Tourism Management)
The Department of Accounting & information Sciences
 College of Humanities
Department of Life-and-Death Studies (Bachelor Program, Master Program)
Department of Literature (Bachelor Program, Master Program)
Department of Early Childhood Education (Bachelor Program, Master Program)
Graduate Institute of Religious Studies
Department of Foreign Languages and Literature (Bachelor Program)
 College of Social Sciences
Department of Communication (Bachelor Program, Master Program)
Graduate Institute of European Studies (Master Program)
Department of Applied Sociology (Bachelor and Master Programs in Sociology; Master Program in Sociology of Education)
Department of International and China Studies (Bachelor Program, Master Program in Asia-Pacific Studies, Master Program in Public Policy Studies)
 College of Arts
Department of Visual and Media Arts (Bachelor Program, Master Program)
Department of Architecture and Landscape Design, Master Program in Environmental Arts (Master Program)
Department of Creative Product Design (Bachelor Program, Master Program)
Art Culture Research Center
Department of Ethnomusicology (Ethnomusicology Group, National Country Music Group) (Bachelor Program, Master Program)
 College of Science and Technology
Department of Information Management (Bachelor Program)
Department of Electronic Commerce Management (Bachelor Program)
Department of Computer Science and Information Engineering (Bachelor Program)
Graduate Institute of Natural Healing Sciences (Master Program)
Department of Natural Biotechnology (Bachelor Program)
Center for General Education

Exchange Institutions

See also
 Fo Guang University
 University of the West

References

External links
 

1996 establishments in Taiwan
Educational institutions established in 1996
Fo Guang Shan
Universities and colleges in Chiayi County
Buddhist universities and colleges in Taiwan
Universities and colleges in Taiwan
Comprehensive universities in Taiwan